The Chad national rugby union team represents Chad in international rugby union. Chad is not a member of World Rugby (IRB) but is a member of the Confederation of African Rugby (CAR). It has yet to play in a Rugby World Cup tournament. 

This team competes in the north section of the CAR Castel Beer Trophy.

See also
 Rugby union in Chad

African national rugby union teams
Rugby union in Chad
Rugby